The pregap on a Red Book audio CD is the portion of the audio track that precedes "index 01" for a given track in the table of contents (TOC). The pregap ("index 00") is typically two seconds long and usually, but not always, contains silence. Popular uses for having the pregap contain audio are live CDs, track interludes, and hidden songs in the pregap of the first track (detailed below).

Unconventional uses of the pregap

Computer data in pregap
The track 01 pregap was used to hide computer data, allowing computers to detect a data track whereas conventional CD players would continue to see the CD as an audio CD.

This method was made obsolete in mid 1996 when an update to Windows 95 in driver SCSI1HLP.VXD made the pregap track inaccessible. It is unclear whether this change in Microsoft Windows' behavior was intentional: for instance, it may have been intended to steer developers away from the pregap method and encourage what became the Blue Book specification "CD Extra" format.

Hidden audio tracks

On certain CDs, such as Light Years by Kylie Minogue, HoboSapiens by John Cale, or Factory Showroom by They Might Be Giants, the pregap before track 1 contains a hidden track. The track is truly hidden in the sense that most conventional standalone players and software CD players will not see it.

Such hidden tracks can be played by playing the first song and "rewinding" (more accurately, seeking in reverse) until the actual start of the whole CD audio track.

Not all CD drives can properly extract such hidden tracks. Some drives will report errors when reading these tracks, and some will seem to extract them properly, but the extracted file will contain only silence.

Other CDs contain additional audio information in the pre-gap area of other tracks, resulting in the audio only being heard on a conventional CD player if the CD is allowed to "play through," but not if you jump to the next track.

Some CDs also contain phantom tracks consisting of only index 0 data, meaning the track can only be played on a conventional CD player by allowing the CD to play through a previous track to the next track.

Pregaps in CD-R media

OS support

Mac OS X: 

Currently does not support more than a 2-second pre-gap in the first track under its CD burning utilities. Using a combination of Roxio Toast and a custom .cue file can provide a way around this.

Ripping of pregap audio is supported by the application X Lossless Decoder.

Windows:

Exact Audio Copy provides the functionality to write to Index 0

Linux:

cdrecord supports writing any kind of pregap
cdrdao supports writing any kind of pregap
K3B, a frontend for several CD/DVD burning/ripping utilities, supports hiding the first track in the pregap of the second one.

See also
List of albums containing a hidden track

Notes

External links
Technical Specifications of the Squirrel Nut Zippers "Hot" ECD

Audio engineering
Compact disc